Deluge is a fireboat (also referred to as a firefighting tug) in New Orleans, Louisiana. Built by Johnson Drydock & Shipbuilding Co. of New Orleans in 1923, she was declared a National Historic Landmark in 1989. She was the nation's second oldest fireboat at the time.

In March 1930, a fire broke out on the freighter Scantic, lasting two days. Ten crew members were killed. It was the first major fire the Deluge had to put out.   
In March 1958, a schoolhouse was on fire in Algiers. The Deluge helped aid the firemen by dousing the school with a quarter of a million gallons of water from the river.

The most famous fire battled by the Deluge was the Christmas Eve fire in 1950. A barge with crude oil smashed into the Standard Oil tanker Baltimore, resulting in an oil spill. Fire quickly engulfed the oil, and from the docks it looked as though the river were on fire. Deluge quickly arrived and peppered the boats and the surrounding area with gallons of water. Successfully, the fireboat ended the threat.

It was common for Deluge to fight forty fires a year. Along with battling fires, Deluge also completed other tasks. She completed numerous towing jobs as well as maintenance after a fire had occurred. This usually required clearing the silt off of docks and boats. Deluge would also rescue floating barges and boats and bring them back to the docks.

The Deluge was retired in 1992.

She is no longer operational and would require hundreds of thousands of dollars to fix. It is possible the fireboat will be stripped for its scrap metal if no buyer comes forward, as the maintenance for the boat is steadily increasing.

References

National Historic Landmarks in Louisiana
Buildings and structures in New Orleans
Fireboats of the United States
Ships on the National Register of Historic Places in Louisiana
1923 ships
National Register of Historic Places in New Orleans